The Gaven Reefs, also known in Mandarin  and ; Burgos Reefs;  and , is a group of two reefs in the Tizard Bank of the Spratly Islands in the South China Sea.

They are occupied and controlled by China (PRC) as part of Sansha, and claimed by Taiwan (ROC), the Philippines and Vietnam. They have a supply platform and a reef fortress.

The southern reef (Xīnán Jiāo) comprises . Since 2014, north reef has been subject to significant reclamation activities.

Geographical features
On 12 July 2016, the tribunal of the Permanent Court of Arbitration concluded that for purposes of Article 121(3) of the Convention, the high-tide features at Gaven Reef (North) are rocks that cannot sustain human habitation or economic life of their own and accordingly shall be entitled to 12nm of territorial sea measured from its baseline but have no exclusive economic zone or continental shelf. PCA also concluded that the features at Gaven Reef (South) are, or in their natural condition were, exposed at low tide and submerged at high tide and are, accordingly low-tide elevations that do not generate entitlement to a territorial sea, exclusive economic zone or continental shelf.

Military development

In late 2016, photographs emerged which suggested that Hughes Reef has been armed with anti-aircraft weapons and a CIWS missile-defence system.

See also
 Great wall of sand
 Nine-dotted line

References

External links
 Asia Maritime Transparency Initiative Island Tracker

Reefs of the Spratly Islands
Reefs of the South China Sea
Reefs of China
Reefs of the Philippines
Reefs of Vietnam
Tizard Bank
Landforms of Khánh Hòa province
Artificial islands of Asia